The Auckland High Court, also known as the Tāmaki Makaurau High Court, is a Gothic Revival courthouse in the Auckland city centre, New Zealand. The Court is one of three locations used by the High Court of New Zealand across New Zealand.  It is registered as a Category I heritage building by Heritage New Zealand.

History 

Construction on the courthouse began in 1865, and was halted due to the original builder going bankrupt. Work on the structure was taken up again by Mathews and Bartley, and the building was completed in 1867. The red brick building was designed by Australian architect Edward Rumsey, who was a student of George Gilbert Scott. Rumsey's Gothic Revival design included features such as crenellated towers and gargoyles, which were carved by Prussian ship carpenter Anton Teutenberg, in designs representing judges and major dignitaries of the 1860s. The courthouse was originally called the Auckland Supreme Court, but the name was changed in 1980 to make way for the naming of an eventual new Supreme Court of New Zealand.

Two pōhutukawa trees behind the court mark the location of the General Assembly House, which was used by the New Zealand Parliament when Auckland was the capital of the country.

In the late 20th century, the court was expanded into a new larger complex, in addition to the original courthouse. The courthouse has been restored and earthquake-strengthened, and an additional court building was added to the rear to increase capacity.

References 

1867 establishments in New Zealand
1860s architecture in New Zealand
High Court
Buildings and structures in Auckland
Courthouses in New Zealand
Heritage New Zealand Category 1 historic places in the Auckland Region
Gothic Revival architecture in New Zealand